Gabriel Batista de Souza (born 3 June 1998) is a Brazilian professional soccer player who plays as goalkeeper for Primeira Liga club Santa Clara.

Club career

Early career
Gabriel started playing futsal at Canto do Rio before moving to Audax Rio. In 2014 he finally moved to Flamengo at the age of 14.

Flamengo
In 2017 Gabriel was promoted to Flamengo's professional team. He started his first game on 17 January 2018 against Volta Redonda for the Campeonato Carioca.

On 31 October 2019 Gabriel played his first Campeonato Brasileiro Série A match replacing Vitinho on the 88th minute after César has been sent off, he conceded the equalizer on the 94th minute as Flamengo draw 2–2 with Goiás.

Sampaio Corrêa loan
On 20 January 2022, Batista joined Sampaio Corrêa on a season-long loan.

Santa Clara
On 17 August 2022, Batista moved on a free transfer to Portuguese side Santa Clara.

Career statistics

Club

Honours

Club
Flamengo
Copa Libertadores: 2019
Recopa Sudamericana: 2020
Campeonato Brasileiro Série A: 2019, 2020
Supercopa do Brasil: 2020, 2021
Campeonato Carioca: 2019, 2020, 2021

References

External links

1998 births
Living people
People from São Gonçalo, Rio de Janeiro
Sportspeople from Rio de Janeiro (state)
Association football goalkeepers
Brazilian footballers
CR Flamengo footballers
Sampaio Corrêa Futebol Clube players
C.D. Santa Clara players
Copa Libertadores-winning players
Campeonato Brasileiro Série A players
Campeonato Brasileiro Série B players
Primeira Liga players
Brazilian expatriate footballers
Expatriate footballers in Portugal
Brazilian expatriate sportspeople in Portugal